Shaaban Robert Secondary School (SRSS) is a co-educational secondary school based in Dar es Salaam, Tanzania. The school is named after the celebrated Tanzanian poet and author, Shaaban Bin Robert.

Background
The School is owned by the Dar es Salaam Secondary Education Society. It is run by a Board of Governors and a Management Committee. Sir Andy Chande is the Chairman of the Board of Governors of the School and President of the Dar es Salaam Secondary Education Society. 

The school has about 50 full-time teaching staff and offers the following facilities:
27 class rooms
5 staff rooms
6 Laboratories
A computer laboratory
A geography room
A library
Teachers' Resource Centre
A staff refreshment room.
A multi purpose hall with a seating capacity of 1000 people.
A sick bay
An audiovisual room
A reprographic room
A basketball, volleyball and tennis court; facilities for badminton and table tennis.
Football and Hockey ground and a running track.
A cricket pitch.
Two canteens

Co - Curricular activities include: debate, extempore, drama, elocution, seminars, field trips, quiz competition and club activities including fine arts and French

Notable alumni
 Adam Malima, Deputy Minister of Agriculture, Food and Cooperatives
 Richa Adhia, Miss Tanzania 2007
 Mohamed Raza, member of the Zanzibar House of Representatives
 Fredrick Alban Kayumbo, Founder of Aspire Group (www.aspiregroup.co.tz), 1989-1993
 Khalid Mohammed aka TID, Bongo flava artist

References

External links

 
Private schools in Tanzania
Education in Dar es Salaam
Educational institutions established in 1963
1963 establishments in Tanganyika